Cat Creek may refer to the following places in the United States:
Cat Creek, Kentucky, a community in Powell County, Kentucky
Cat Creek (Missouri), a stream in Missouri
Cat Creek, Montana, a community in Petroleum County, Montana
Cat Creek Oil Field, an oil field in Petroleum County, Montana
Cat Creek (Wisconsin), a stream in Wisconsin